Vogelsanck Castle is a moated castle in Zolder in the municipality of Heusden-Zolder, province of Limburg, Belgium.

From 1308 to 1795 the castle was the centre of government of the free territory of Vogelsanck, which comprised the present villages of Zolder, Zonhoven, Houthalen, Stokrooie and the southern part of Heusden. Since 1741 the castle has belonged to the de Villenfagne de Vogelsanck family.

The castle is situated to the north of the N72 between Hasselt and Beringen, which cuts the estate in two.

Sources
 Cops, Luc, 1991: De Heerlijkheid Vogelsanck, 250 jaar familie de Villenfagne in Zolder-Vogelsanck. VVV Heusden-Zolder
 Gids voor Vlaanderen Toeristische en culturele gids van de Vlaamse gemeenten (4th edition, 1995). VTB/VAB-Uitgeverij Lannoo: Antwerpen-Tielt

External links 
 Website of the municipality of Heusden-Zolder: Het kasteel Vogelsanck

See also
List of castles in Belgium

Castles in Belgium
Castles in Limburg (Belgium)
Heusden-Zolder